The Fuggerschloss Babenhausen is a castle in Babenhausen, Bavaria. It is the home of the Fugger-Babenhausen family, which was promoted to the status of Imperial Princes in 1803.

References

External links 

 Die Linie Fugger-Babenhausen (in German)

Castles in Bavaria
15th-century architecture
Buildings and structures associated with the Fugger family